Jared Kennedy Fitzgerald (born 16 August 1998) is a Bahamian swimmer. In 2019, he represented Bahamas at the 2019 World Aquatics Championships in Gwangju, South Korea. He competed in the men's 50 metre freestyle and men's 100 metre freestyle events.

In 2019, he competed in the men's 100 metre freestyle event at the 2019 Pan American Games held in Lima, Peru. He also competed in three relay events.

References 

Living people
1998 births
Place of birth missing (living people)
Bahamian male freestyle swimmers
Swimmers at the 2019 Pan American Games
Pan American Games competitors for the Bahamas